Per Arnoldi (born May 25, 1941 in Copenhagen) is a Danish designer and artist. He has worked with many media, including painting, sculptures, ceramics and posters and has made designs for many companies, organisations and institutions, doing air planes, train stations, hospitals, architecture, monuments, stores, company profiles, handicrafts and everyday utensils. His characteristic simplistic expressions are often categorized as modern art. Arnoldi has worked in many countries around the world and is on permanent exhibit in several prestigious art and design institutions for his unique and influential productions, including Museum of Modern Art in New York.

Apart from his prolific poster art production, some of Arnoldi's best known single works are the logo and curtains designs of the Copenhagen Opera House from 2004 and London's National Police Memorial, co-designed with Peter Ridley from Foster + Partners. Other well-known works include the "Romantic Construction", "The Wall", and "Corrections". Herning Museum of Contemporary Art in Denmark holds the largest permanent display of his work.

In Denmark, Arnoldi is a well-known art mediator, hosting TV shows about art through most of the 80's. From 2008 to 2010, he was a member of Akademirådet (The Academy Council) at the Royal Danish Academy of Fine Arts and he was appointed chairman for Kunstrådet (The Art Council) in the Danish government administration for about a year in 2011.

Background 
Arnoldi is educated schoolteacher and worked as such for a short time before his interest in and engagement with painting, design and art became his primary occupation. He is best known for his poster art and in particular his DSB train posters from 1975 onwards became public darlings in Denmark. He worked with the magazine Mobilia (about modernist furniture, interior decoration and crafts) for about 10 years, learning the craft of graphic design. As a painter, Arnoldi is autodidact and he exhibited for the first time in 1961, twenty years old.

Per Arnoldi is a lifelong fan of jazz music, and apart from his many jazz related posters, he hosts monthly jazz radio shows and occasionally tours with a jazz trio.

Work

Museums representation
Museums where Per Arnoldi's work is represented include:
Museum of Modern Art, New York City, United States
Museum of Modern Art, Toyama, Japan
Victoria and Albert Museum, London
Cooper Hewitt, Smithsonian Design Museum, New York, United States
Stedelijk Museum, Amsterdam
Gemeentemuseum Den Haag, Haag
Neues Museum für Angewandte Kunst, München
Israel Museum, Jerusalem
Royal Print Collection, Danish National Gallery, Copenhagen
Kunstindustrimuseet
Nordjyllands Kunstmuseum
Randers Kunstmuseum

Commissions
Per Arnoldi has created art work for institutions such as:
 Commerzbank Headquarters, Frankfurt
 Der Reichstag, Berlin
Deutsche Bundesbahn
Japan Railways
 Tanaka Business School, London

Poster work
Per Arnoldi has made posters for institutions including:
Guggenheim Museum, New York City
Museum of Contemporary Art, Chicago
Lincoln Center, New York City
Louisiana Museum of Modern Art, Denmark
Royal Danish Theatre
American Ballet Theatre
Chicago Symphony Orchestra
Montreux Festival
British Rail
DSB
Novo Nordisk
Siemens

Awards and accolades
 1985  Toulouse-Lautrec Award
 1993 Prix Savignac, Paris
 1996  Gold medal at 4th Poster Biennale, Mexico City
 1997 Honor Award, American Institute of Architects
Statens Kunstfond's 3-years work grant, 2000
 2000 Eckersberg Medal, Royal Danish Academy of Fine Arts
 2003 Order of the Dannebrogsordenen

Literature 
Per Arnoldi has written and authored several books.

 Per Arnoldi (2017): "Solo", Gyldendal 
 Per Arnoldi (2015): "Rodchenkos korridor og andre opdelinger",  Viborg Kunsthals Forlag 
 Per Arnoldi (2007): "Colour is Communication. Selected Projects for Foster + Partners", Birkhauser
 Per Arnoldi (1991): "Allround", HEART - Herning Museum of Contemporary Art

Notes and references

External links

Kunstonline profile
Per Arnoldi tilstår alt, Politiken, September 28, 2009

Danish artists
Danish poster artists
Danish designers
1941 births
Living people
Recipients of the Eckersberg Medal